Guru  is a 2007 Indian  drama film directed and co-written by Mani Ratnam. It was produced by Mani Ratnam and his brother G. Srinivasan under their production company, Madras Talkies. The film features Abhishek Bachchan, Aishwarya Rai, Madhavan, Vidya Balan, Arya Babbar, and Mithun Chakraborty in the leading roles. The film also has Mallika Sherawat in a guest appearance. The soundtrack and score were composed by A. R. Rahman, while the cinematography was handled by Rajiv Menon and editing done by A. Sreekar Prasad. The general consensus is that this film is largely based on the life of one of India's biggest industrial tycoons, Dhirubhai Ambani, but also has elements of other stories and businessmen. 

Guru was released on 12 January 2007 and grossed 830.7 million. The film garnered awards and nominations in several categories, with particular praise for its direction, music, cinematography, and for the lead performances (Abhishek and Aishwarya). The film won 19 awards from 76 nominations. The film was premiered in the Tous Les Cinemas du Monde (World Cinema) section of 2007 Cannes Film Festival.

At the 53rd Filmfare Awards, Guru was nominated in fourteen categories, winning Best Music Director and Best Background Score (A. R. Rahman), Best Female Playback Singer (Shreya Ghoshal for "Barso Re"), Best Choreography (Saroj Khan for "Barso Re") and Best Production Design (Samir Chanda). At the 9th IIFA Awards, it received ten nominations and won two, including those for Best Music Director (A. R. Rahman) and Best Female Playback Singer (Shreya Ghoshal for "Barso Re"). Among other wins, the film received three Producers Guild Film Awards from 18 nominations, three Screen Awards from 14 nominations, three V. Shantaram Awards, three Zee Cine Awards  from 10 nominations and at the Stardust Awards it was nominated in 7 categories without winning.

Awards and nominations

See also 
 List of Bollywood films of 2007

Notes

References

External links 
 Accolades for Guru at the Internet Movie Database

Lists of accolades by Indian film